Ken Fiebelman (December 19, 1941 – January 3, 2017) was an American politician who served in the Missouri House of Representatives from 1985 to 1997.

He died on January 3, 2017, in Salem, Missouri at age 75.

References

1941 births
2017 deaths
Democratic Party members of the Missouri House of Representatives